Gerard is a masculine forename of Proto-Germanic origin, variations of which exist in many Germanic and Romance languages. Like many other early Germanic names, it is dithematic, consisting of two meaningful constituents put together. In this case, those constituents are gari > ger- (meaning 'spear') and -hard (meaning 'hard/strong/brave').

Common forms of the name are Gerard (English, Scottish, Irish, Dutch, Polish and Catalan); Gerrard (English, Scottish, Irish); Gerardo (Italian, and Spanish); Geraldo (Portuguese); Gherardo (Italian); Gherardi  (Northern Italian, now only a surname); Gérard (variant forms Girard and Guérard, now only surnames, French); Gearóid (Irish); Gerhardt and Gerhart/Gerhard/Gerhardus (German, Dutch, and Afrikaans); Gellért (Hungarian); Gerardas (Lithuanian) and Gerards/Ģirts (Latvian); Γεράρδης (Greece). A few abbreviated forms are Gerry and Jerry (English);  Gerd (German) and Gert (Afrikaans and Dutch); Gerrit (Afrikaans and Dutch); Gertjie (Afrikaans); Geert (Dutch) and Жоро (Bulgarian).

The introduction of the name 'Gerard' into the English language took place following the Norman conquest of England in 1066. Its original forms in Old French were “Gerard, Gerart” [dʒeʁɑʁ] and “Girart”.

Patronymic surnames derived from a form of Gerard include Garrard, Garritsen, Gerard, Geertsen, Gerardet, Gerardi, Gerdes, Gerrard, Gerretsen, Gerrits(e), Gerritsen, Ghiraldi, and Giraud.

The name Gerald, while phonetically similar to Gerard, derives from a slightly different set of constituents: ger and wald (meaning 'rule/lead').

First name

Academics
Gerard Bolland (1854–1922), Dutch philosopher and radical
Gerard Clauson (1891–1974), English Orientalist
Gerard of Cremona (1114–1187), Italian translator of scientific Arabic works
Gerard De Geer (1858–1943), Swedish geologist
Gerard Heymans (1857–1930), Dutch philosopher and psychologist
Gerard Hendrik Hofstede (born 1928), Dutch social psychologist
Gerard 't Hooft (born 1946), Dutch theoretical physicist
Gerard de Jode (1509–1591), Dutch cartographer, engraver and publisher
Gerard Krefft (1830–1881), Australian zoologist
Gerard de Kremer (1512–1594), Flemish cartographer, geographer and cosmographer
Gerard Kuiper (1905–1973), Dutch–American astronomer
Gerard Labuda (1916–2010), Polish historian
Gerard van der Leeuw (1890–1950), Dutch historian and philosopher of religion
Gerard K. O'Neill (1927–1992), American physicist and space activist
Gerard Salton (1927–1995), German–born American computer scientist
Gerard van Swieten (1700–1772), Dutch–Austrian physician

Arts

Music
Gerard Joling (born 1960), Dutch pop singer
Gerard Mortier (1943–2014), Belgian opera director and administrator
Gerard Nolan (1946–1992), American rock drummer
Gerard Schwarz (born 1947), American conductor
Gerard Way (born 1977), American singer-songwriter and comic book writer

Theater and film
Gerard Depardieu (born 1948), French actor, filmmaker, and vineyard owner
Gerard Montgomery Bluefeather (1887–1963), American movie actor known as "Monte Blue"
Gerard Butler (born 1969), Scottish actor
Gerard Damiano (1928–2008), American director of adult films
Gerard Marenghi (born 1920), American actor
Gerard McSorley (born 1950), Irish actor
Gerard Murphy (Irish actor) (1948–2013), Northern Irish actor
Gerard Kenneth Tierney (1924–1985), American TV and western actor known as Scott Brady

Visual arts
Gerard Bilders (1838–1865), Dutch  painter and art collector
Gerard ter Borch (1617–1681), Dutch painter
Gerard David (1460–1523), Dutch painter
Gerard Dou (1613–1675), Dutch genre painter
Gerard Douffet (1594–1660), Flemish painter
Gerard Edelinck (1640–1707), Flemish–born French engraver
Gerard Hoet (1648–1733), Dutch painter and engraver
Gerard van Honthorst (1592–1656), Dutch painter
Gerard Horenbout (c. 1465–c. 1541), Flemish miniaturist a.k.a. the Master of James IV of Scotland
Gerard Houckgeest (c. 1600–1661), Dutch architectural and church interior painter
Gerard de Lairesse (1641–1711), Dutch painter and art theorist
Gerard Moerdijk (1890–1958), South African architect
Gerard Thomas Rietveld (1888–1964), Dutch furniture designer and architect
Gerard Seghers (1591–1651), Flemish painter, art collector, and art dealer
Gerard van Spaendonck (1746–1822), Dutch floral painter

Writing
Gerard F. Conway (born 1952), American writer of comic books and television shows
Gerard Malanga (born 1943), American poet, photographer, filmmaker, curator and archivist.
Gerard Manley Hopkins (1844–1889), British poet
Gérard de Nerval (1808–1855), nom-de-plume of French writer, poet, and translator Gérard Labrunie
Gerard Reve (1923–2006), Dutch writer
Gerard Walschap (1898–1989), Belgian writer

Business
Gerard Adriaan Heineken (1841–1893), Dutch founder of Heineken beer
Gerard Kleisterlee (born 1946), Dutch business executive, CEO of Philips
Gerard Philips (1858–1942), Dutch co–founder of "Philips"
Gerard Reynst (1560s–1615), Dutch merchant and Governor–General of the Dutch East Indies

Crime
Gerard Conlon (1954–2014), wrongfully imprisoned Northern Irishman, subject of "In the Name of the Father,"
Gerard John Schaefer (1946–1995), American serial killer
Gerard Mahon, part of a married Irish couple who with wife was murdered in Twinbrook, Belfast

Medieval rulers
Gerard I of Paris (d. 779), count of Paris
Gerard, Count of Auvergne (died 841), son of Pepin I
Gerhard I of Metz  (c. 875–910), count of Metz
Gerard, Duke of Lorraine (c. 1030–1070), Lotharingian nobleman
Gerard Grenier (died c. 1170), Lord of Sidon, Kingdom of Jerusalem
Gerard I, Count of Guelders (c. 1060–1120)
Gerard II, Count of Guelders (died 1131)
Gerard, Count of Loon (died 1191)
Gerard, Count of Rieneck (died 1216), son of Gerard, Count of Loon
Gerard III, Count of Guelders (1185–1229)
Gerhard III, Count of Holstein-Rendsburg (died 1340)

Military
Gerard Bucknall (1894–1980), British army general
Gerard Pietersz Hulft (1621–1656), Dutch general
Gerard Lake, 1st Viscount Lake (1744–1808), British general
Gerard de Ridefort (died 1189), Flemish Grand Master of the Knights Templar

Politics
Gerard Adams (born 1948), Irish politician, leader of the Sinn Feín party
Gerard Batliner (1928–2008), Prime Minister of Liechtenstein
Gerard Batten (born 1954), English UKIP politician
Gerard Anthony Brownlee (born 1956), New Zealand government minister
Gerard Collier, 5th Baron Monkswell (1947–2020), British politician
Gerard Cooreman (1852–1926), Belgian Prime Minister
Gerard Wijeyekoon (1878-1952), Sri Lankan Sinhala lawyer and politician, first President of the Senate of Ceylon

Religion
Gerard, Abbot of Brogne (c. 895–959), Belgian abbot and saint
Gerard of Toul (935–994), German bishop and saint
Gerard of Csanád (died 1046), Hungarian bishop and saint, a.k.a. Gerard Sagredo
Gerard of Florennes (c. 975–1051), Bishop of Cambrai
Gerard of Burgundy (died 1061), known as Pope Nicholas II
Gerard (archbishop of York) (died 1108), English archbishop
Blessed Gerard (c. 1040–1120), Benedictine founder of the Knights Hospitaller
Gerard Segarelli (c. 1240–1309), Italian founder of the Apostolic Brethern
Gérard de Dainville (died 1378), Bishop of Cambrai
Gerard Groote (1340–1384), Dutch founder of the Brethren of the Common Life
Gerard van Groesbeeck (1517–1580), Flemish bishop and cardinal
Gerard Majella (1726–1755), Italian lay brother and saint
Gerard de Korte (born 1955), Dutch Roman Catholic bishop

Sports
Gerard Cieślik (1927–2013), Polish football striker
Gerard Deulofeu (born 1994), Spanish football forward
Gerard Kemkers (born 1967), Dutch speed skater and skating coach
Gerard Friedrich Knetemann (1951–2004), Dutch racing cyclist
Gerard López (born 1979), Spanish football midfielder
Gerard Moreno (born 1992), Spanish football striker
Gerard Nijboer (born 1955), Dutch long–distance runner
Gerard Piqué (born 1987), Spanish football defender
Gerard Plessers (born 1959), Belgian football defender
Gerard de Rooy (born 1980), Dutch truck racer
Gerard van Velde (born 1971), Dutch speed skater and skating coach

Last name

Alexander Gerard (1728–1795), Scottish church minister and academic
Alexander Gerard (explorer) (1792–1839), Scottish army officer and Himalayan explorer
A. E. Gerard (1877–1950), Alfred Edward Gerard, founder of several South Australian electrical businesses
Alphonso Gerard (1916–2002), Negro league baseball player
Darren Gerard (born 1984), English cricketer 
Dorothea Gerard (1855-1915), Scottish novelist
Eddie Gerard (1890–1937), Canadian professional ice hockey player and coach
Emily Gerard (1849–1905), Scottish author
Étienne Maurice Gérard (1773–1852), French general and politician
Geoff Gerard (born 1955), Australian rugby league player
Geoff Gerard (politician) (1904–1997), New Zealand politician
Gil Gerard (born 1943), American actor
Sir Gilbert Gerard, 1st Baronet of Harrow on the Hill (1587–1670), English politician
Gilbert Gerard (judge) (died 1593), English lawyer and judge
Gilbert Gerard (theological writer) (1760–1815), Scottish writer
Jack N. Gerard (born 1957), leader in The Church of Jesus Christ of Latter-day Saints
Jacques Gérard, French World War I flying ace
James W. Gerard (1867–1951), American lawyer and diplomat
Jim Gerard (born 1936), New Zealand politician
John Gerard (1545–1612), English botanist
John Gerard (Jesuit) (died 1637)
Leo Gerard (born 1947), Canadian labour union leader
Ralph W. Gerard (1900–1974), American neurophysiologist
Red Gerard (born 2000), American snowboarder
Richard Gerard of Hilderstone (1635–1680), English landowner
Robert Gerard (born 1944) South Australian electrical merchant and manufacturer
Sumner Gerard (1916–2005), American businessman, Montana politician, and US Ambassador to Jamaica

Fictional characters
Prince Gerard Himerce, the main hero of Gaiapolis
Brigadier Gerard in the novel Uncle Bernac and the short story anthologies The Adventures of Gerard and "The Exploits of Brigadier Gerard, by Arthur Conan Doyle
Joe Gerard, husband of the title character in the 1970s television series RhodaPhilip Gerard, pursuer of the title character in the television series The FugitiveSamuel Gerard, in the films The Fugitive and U.S. MarshalsGerard DuGalle, in the video game StarCraft: Brood WarGerard Duval, in the 1929 novel All Quiet on the Western Front by Erich Maria Remarque
Gérard, in the Chronicles of Amber novel series by Roger Zelazny
Gerard Argent, a werewolf hunter and antagonist in MTV's cult television show Teen Wolf.
Marcel Gerard, a vampire and ruler of the New Orleans supernatural community in The CW network's television series The Originals''.
 Gerard Valkyrie is a Quincy and a member of the Wandenreich's Sternritter with the designation "M" - The Miracle from the Bleach manga

See also
Gérard
Gerhard
Gerhardt
Gerad (disambiguation)
Gerhart
Gerald (disambiguation)
Gerrard (disambiguation)
Girard (disambiguation)
Guerard (disambiguation)
Saint Gerard (disambiguation)

References

English-language surnames
Patronymic surnames
Dutch masculine given names
English masculine given names
Polish masculine given names